Laukhella is a village in Senja Municipality in Troms og Finnmark county, Norway. The village lies to the west of the village of Silsand on the island of Senja.

The village and surrounding area is home to several hundred people, and one major local industry is a prefabricated house factory. Islandsbotn stadium is also here, which is the home field of the FK Senja football team.

References

Lenvik
Villages in Troms
Populated places of Arctic Norway
Senja